Silence (Chinese: 龍耳) is a Hong Kong charity, with a focus on deaf people who use Hong Kong Sign Language and their family and friends, and is also a member of the Hong Kong Council of Social Service.

Objectives
 Promote and popularise sign language
 Career and Job Placement Assistance
 Social Advocacy
 Develop Life Education

Chairman
 Polly Lam (2008-2010)
 Mandy Tang (2010-2012)
 Amy Bou (2012-2013)
 William Tang (2013–present)

Committee member
 Siu Yat-chan

References

External links 
 

Deafness organizations
Deaf culture in Hong Kong
2008 establishments in Hong Kong
Organizations established in 2008
Disability organisations based in Hong Kong